Arif Mustafa Jatoi is a Pakistani politician who has been a member of the Provincial Assembly of Sindh since August 2018. Previously he was a member of the Provincial Assembly of Sindh from 2002 till 2008 and 2008 till 2013.

Political career
He was elected to the Provincial Assembly of Sindh as a candidate of National Peoples Party from Constituency PS-19 (Naushahro Feroze-I) in 2008 Pakistani general election. He received 53,302 votes and defeated Haji Khan Bhatti, a candidate of Pakistan Peoples Party (PPP).

He was re-elected to the Provincial Assembly of Sindh as a candidate of Grand Democratic Alliance from Constituency PS-36 (Naushahro Feroze-IV) in 2018 Pakistani general election. He received 47,406 votes and defeated Zia-ul-Hassan, a candidate of Pakistan Peoples Party Parliamentarians (PPP).

References

Living people
Grand Democratic Alliance MPAs (Sindh)
Sindh MPAs 2008–2013
Sindh MPAs 2018–2023
Arif Mustafa
Year of birth missing (living people)
Children of prime ministers of Pakistan